Tricella is a genus of robber flies in the family Asilidae. There is at least one described species in Tricella, T. calcar.

Tricella was also a name for a genus of leafhoppers recently, but it was renamed to Carpaneura in 2017.

References

Further reading

 

Asilidae
Asilidae genera